Lefkochori is a village in the municipal unit of Gastouni, Elis.  Its population was 546 at the 2011 census. It is situated in a flat rural area, on the left bank of the river Pineios, at about 10 m elevation. It is 1 km southeast of Kavasila, 2 km northwest of Koroivos, 3 km west of Agia Mavra and 3 km northeast of Gastouni. The Greek National Road 9 (Patras - Pyrgos) and the railway from Patras to Pyrgos pass west of the village.

Population history

See also
List of settlements in Elis

References

External links
GTP - Lefkochori

Populated places in Elis